"Hang Your Head" is the fourth and final single from Scottish band Deacon Blue's fourth studio album, Whatever You Say, Say Nothing (1993). The single version of the song is very similar to the album version, except that it has a slightly longer introduction and also has a cold start in place of the album version's fade-in. This was the first Deacon Blue single release to exclude all vinyl formats. It reached a peak of number 21 on the UK Singles Chart in July 1993.

B-sides
The first B-side is the upbeat rock song, "Freedom Train", which is an original composition by the band, but is only presented in a live version. The other two B-sides are the soaring "Here on the Wind" and Ricky and Lorraine's gentle duet, "Indigo Sky", both of which contain imagery related to the biblical account of Adam and Eve. "Indigo Sky" would later be released on The Very Best of Deacon Blue.

As with the previous release, "Only Tender Love", a special-edition CD single entitled "The Riches Collection Part 2" was issued. In addition to "Hang Your Head", it again contained three tracks from the Riches bonus album.

Track listings
All songs were written by Ricky Ross except where noted.

References

Deacon Blue songs
1993 singles
1993 songs
Columbia Records singles
Song recordings produced by Paul Oakenfold
Songs written by Ricky Ross (musician)